The Corn Is Green is a 1938 semi-autobiographical play by Welsh dramatist and actor Emlyn Williams. The play premiered in London at the Duchess Theatre in September 1938; with Sybil Thorndike as Miss Moffat and Williams himself portraying Morgan Evans, the West End production ran in all for 600 performances. The original Broadway production starred Ethel Barrymore and premiered at the National Theatre in November 1940, running for 477 performances.

Plot 

L.C. Moffat is a strong-willed English school teacher working in a poverty-stricken coal mining village in late 19th century Wales. She struggles to win the local Welsh miners over to her English ways, and an illiterate teenager by the name of Morgan Evans eventually graduates with honours.

Background
Born in 1905, Emlyn Williams grew up in the impoverished coal-mining town of Mostyn in Flintshire, Wales, and spoke only Welsh until the age of eight. He was barely literate, and later said he would probably have begun working in the mines at age 12 if he had not caught the attention of a London social worker named Sarah Grace Cooke. She established a school in Mostyn in 1915, and recognized Williams' aptitude for languages. Over the next seven years she worked with him on his English and helped him prepare to be a teacher. She obtained a scholarship for him in Switzerland, to study French, and when he was 17 she helped him win a scholarship at Christ Church, Oxford. During his studies there Williams had a nervous breakdown, but Cooke encouraged him to write as a way to recover. His first play, Full Moon, was produced while he was still at Oxford. His first success, A Murder Has Been Arranged, was staged in 1930, followed by the hit thriller, Night Must Fall (1935). The Corn Is Green is considered Williams' most enduring literary credit.

Production

London production
The Corn Is Green, directed by the author, premiered on September 20, 1938 at the Duchess Theatre in London, following a five-week tour that began on August 15. The outbreak of war forced the closure of the Duchess run on September 2, 1939, after 395 performances. The same production then toured for 11 weeks prior to returning to the West End, at the Piccadilly Theatre, on December 19, 1939 and running till June 15, 1940. The combined West End run totalled 600 performances.

Cast
 John Glyn-Jones as John Goronwy Jones
 Christine Silver as Miss Ronberry
 William John Davies as Idwal Morris
 Dorothy Langley as Sarah Pugh
 Albert Biddiscombe as Groom
 Frederick Lloyd as Squire
 Betty Jardine as Bessie Watty
 Kathleen Harrison as Mrs. Watty
 Sybil Thorndike as Miss Moffat
 Kenneth Evans as Robbart Robbatch
 Wynford Morse as Glyn Thomas
 Jack Glyn as Will Hughes
 Glan Williams as John Owen
 Emlyn Williams as Morgan Evans
 Frank Dunlop as Old Tom

Broadway production

Produced and directed by Herman Shumlin, the Broadway production of The Corn Is Green opened November 26, 1940 at the National Theatre. The setting was designed by Howard Bay; costumes were designed by Ernest Schrapps. The production transferred to the Royale Theatre on September 9, 1941, and closed January 17, 1942, after a total of 477 performances.

Cast 
 Rhys Williams as John Goronwy Jones
 Mildred Dunnock Miss Ronberry
 Charles S. Pursell as Idwal Morris
 Gwyneth Hughes as Sarah Pugh
 George Bleasdale as Groom
 Edmund Breon as Squire
 Rosalind Ivan as Mrs. Watty
 Thelma Schnee as Bessie Watty
 Ethel Barrymore as Miss Moffat
 Thomas Lyons as Robbart Robbatch
 Richard Waring as Morgan Evans
 Kenneth Clarke as Glyn Thomas
 Merritt O'Duel as John Owen
Terence Morgan as Will Hughes
Sayre Crawley as Old Tom

Boys, girls and parents were played by Julia Knox, Amelia Romano, Betty Conibear, Rosalind Carter, Harda Normann, Joseph McInerney, Marcel Dill, Gwilym Williams and Tommy Dix.

Broadway production (return engagement)
Barrymore and Waring reprised their roles in a return engagement—again produced and directed by Herman Shumlin—that ran May 3 – June 19, 1943 at the Martin Beck Theatre.

Cast 
 Ethel Barrymore as Miss Moffat
 Kenneth Clarke as Idwal Morris
 Peter Harris as John Owen
 Gwyneth Hughes as Sarah Pugh
 Bert Kalmar as Will Hughes
 Eva Leonard-Boyne as Mrs. Watty
 Esther Mitchell as Miss Ronberry
 Patrick O'Connor as Robbart Robbatch
 Gene Ross as Glyn Thomas
 Lewis L. Russell as The Squire
 Richard Waring as Morgan Evans
 Tom E. Williams as John Goronwy Jones
 J.P. Wilson as Old Tom
 Perry Wilson as Bessie Watty
 George Bleasdale A Groom

Reception

Revivals
 Olney Theater in Maryland presented The Corn Is Green in 1949, and it was in this production that Disney and Hawaii-Five-O star James MacArthur (adopted son of Actor Helen Hayes) first appeared on stage. It was James' sister Mary who got young James his part, pleading with their parents for James to accompany her to Maryland for the summer. See Wikipedia biography of James MacArthur.
 The New York City Theatre Company presented The Corn Is Green January 11–22, 1950, at New York City Center in a production starring Eva Le Gallienne and Richard Waring.
 In 1981, the play was produced at the Royal Exchange, Manchester directed by James Maxwell with Avril Elgar as Miss Moffatt and Alan Parnaby as Morgan Evans
 After 21 previews, a Broadway revival directed by Vivian Matalon and produced by Elizabeth Taylor and Zev Buffman opened on August 22, 1983, at the Lunt-Fontanne Theatre. Cicely Tyson portrayed Miss Moffat, with Peter Gallagher as Morgan Evans, Marge Redmond as Mrs. Watty, and Mia Dillon as Bessie Watty. The show closed on September 18, 1983, after 32 performances.
 In 1985, the play enjoyed a successful revival at the Old Vic Theatre in London, starring Deborah Kerr.
 In 2009, Boston's Huntington Theatre Company presented a revival of The Corn Is Green starring Kate Burton and her son Morgan Ritchie.
In 2022, the National Theatre in London staged a new production starring Nicola Walker as Miss Moffat and Gareth David-Lloyd, directed by Dominic Cooke

Adaptations 
In 1945, a film adaptation was made with Bette Davis (herself of Welsh descent) as Moffat.

The BBC adapted the play for television in 1968 as a Play of the Month.

In 1974, Davis returned to the role in a musical stage adaptation that proved to be a disaster. The setting was changed to the American South, with the young man transformed into an African-American field worker (portrayed by Dorian Harewood). When the pre-Broadway run opened in Philadelphia, critics were unimpressed. Plans for revisions were cut short when Davis fell ill, and the show closed abruptly after eight performances. The musical later was staged for a short run in Indianapolis with Ginger Rogers as Miss Moffat.

A 1979 made-for-television movie, directed by George Cukor and starring Katharine Hepburn, was filmed on location in Wales.

References

External links

The Corn Is Green at the Internet Archive (1941 Random House edition)
1947 Theatre Guild on the Air radio play adaptation at Internet Archive

1938 plays
Broadway plays
Plays by Emlyn Williams
British plays adapted into films
West End plays